En rachâchant is a 1982 short French film directed by Danièle Huillet and Jean-Marie Straub.

Cast
 Olivier Straub as Ernesto
 Nadette Thinus as The Mom
 Bernard Thinus as The Dad
 Raymond Gérard as The Teacher

References

External links

1982 films
1982 short films
1980s French-language films
French black-and-white films
French short films
Films based on works by Marguerite Duras
Films directed by Jean-Marie Straub and Danièle Huillet
1980s French films